Il Mare (lit. "time-transcending love") is a 2000 South Korean film, starring Lee Jung-jae and Jun Ji-hyun, and directed by Lee Hyun-seung. The title, Il Mare, means "The Sea" in Italian, and is the name of the seaside house which is the setting of the story. The two protagonists both live there two years apart in time, but are able to communicate through a mysterious mailbox.

The film was remade by Warner Brothers in 2006 as the American film The Lake House starring Keanu Reeves and Sandra Bullock.

The plot of the movie was also used in the 2015 Indian Kannada  movie Minchagi Nee Baralu.

Plot 
There are two distinct time-lines intertwined throughout most of the film.

The story begins with Eun-joo moving out of a house by the sea called "Il Mare".  As she is leaving, she leaves a Christmas card in the mailbox, asking the next resident to please forward her mail to her.  Sung-hyun, an architectural student, receives her card, but is puzzled, since he is the first resident at "Il Mare" and the card is dated 2 years in the future.  After a series of back and forth correspondences, Eun-joo and Sung-hyun realize they are living 2 years apart, Eun-joo in the year 1999 and Sung-hyun in the year 1997.  After some testing, Eun-joo and Sung-hyun discover that the mailbox at "Il Mare" is enabling their communication and they can pass objects and living creatures through.

Utilizing the mailbox, Eun-joo asks Sung-hyun to retrieve a tape player she lost two years ago, which he gets for her.  After his estranged father, a noted architect, falls ill, Sung-hyun asks Eun-joo to obtain a book about his father, which she does. However, she succumbs to a minor traffic accident and while hospitalized, the book fails to reach Sung-hyun in time before his father's death. After reading the book, he finally accepts his father's love for him and takes up his architectural work once more.

As both Eun-joo and Sung-hyun continue their correspondence, they decide to try a date together, with each person participating in his or her own time.  Eun-joo "takes" Sung-hyun to an amusement park, where he follows her instructions on how to have a good time at the park.  Sung-hyun "takes" her to a restaurant where she drinks a bottle of wine he left for her two years prior.  Despite having a lot of fun on these solo "dates", they decide that they should try to meet in person.

Eun-joo and Sung-hyun plan on meeting in person at a beach two years in Sung-hyun's future.  However, when Eun-joo goes to the beach, Sung-hyun does not show.  She does see a house being built on the beach for an unknown architect's lover.  When Eun-joo tells Sung-hyun that he didn't come, he is baffled about why he didn't show up; he does not think he would have forgotten such an important date. Although Sung-Hyun does not meet Eun-joo at the agreed upon date, he still makes a trip out to the beach they agreed to meet.  He is moved by the beauty of the beach and decides to design a house for her on the very beach.  Sung-hyun may have wanted to show Eun-Joo his love for her, and even though somehow not being able to meet her on the future date, the designed house will show her that he is there at the beach.

At Eun-joo's workplace, she runs into her ex-fiance.  They were going to get married, but he moved abroad for work, while she stayed in Korea.  Due to the separation, they eventually broke up and he married another person; Eun-joo however still loves him.  This meeting was a shock to Eun-joo and in an act of desperation, she asks Sung-hyun to intervene and stop her fiance from leaving two years in the past.

Sung-Hyun after receiving the letter to intervene between Eun-joo and her fiancé from separating, is heart-broken.  Sung-Hyun is torn between his love for Eun-joo, and Eun-Joo's request to help her not to lose her previous lover.  After some long hard contemplation, Sung-Hyun against his own hearts desires, agrees to help her. Helping Eun-joo's request would be like tearing out his own heart, very similar to this quote from Javan, "When you truly know the meaning of the word love, you will also know the meaning of the word pain." Sung-hyun writes back wishing Eun-joo good luck to her and her fiancé in the future.

After receiving the heart-felt reply from Sung-hyun to help, Eun-joo decides to visit his architectural school. Eun-joo may have hoped to meet him in person and thank him somehow.  She finds the architectural department and is greeted by a friend of Sung-Hyun. Eun-joo asked for Sung-Hyun, but was told of a tragic accident.  Sung-Hyun was to meet a friend of his, but was involved in a fatal traffic accident 2 years ago.  Eun-joo suddenly realizes, on the day, she last met her fiancé before they separated, she also witnessed a car striking a pedestrian and killing him.  Sung-hyun was that very pedestrian and the house being built at the beach was designed by Sung-hyun for her.  She immediately rushes to the mailbox and sends a letter begging him not to go, also in hope that the message is received in time.

The final scene returns to the beginning of the movie, where Eun-joo is about to place her Christmas card into the mailbox at "Il Mare".  A stranger approaches her with a letter in his hand, the letter that Eun-joo sent warning Sung-hyun not to go to the meeting.  Sung-hyun did receive her warning letter and never went to intervene that day and was never hit by the car. Eun-joo and Sung-hyun finally meet.

Cast
 Lee Jung-jae as Sung-hyun, a young man who was the first tenant of the house. Living two years in the past of 1997, he begins as a construction worker for a large project. Although a talented architect, Sung-hyun has become critical of his talents, claiming he could not stand becoming a hypocrite.
 Jun Ji-hyun as Eun-joo, a young woman who has aspirations of becoming a voice actress. Throughout the film, we see that although she has obtained her dream, there is something missing in her life. Living in 1999, Eun-joo becomes the second tenant of the house and is only moving out as the film begins.
Kim Mu-saeng
Jo Seung-yeon
Min Yun-jae
Kim Ji-mu
Choi Yoon-yeong
Lee In-chul
Kwon Yeon-gyeong

Location
The setting for the movie was shot on Ganghwa Island's Sukmodo, and Jeju Island's Udo.

Reception
This time-travel romance was not a popular success in 2000, selling less than a quarter million tickets in Seoul (upstaged by not only the similar-themed Ditto, but also the controversial Lies), but since then it has developed a loyal fan base a la Somewhere in Time and attained the status of a minor classic among Korean cinema fans.

Remake 

Warner Brothers acquired the rights for an American remake, titled The Lake House, starring Keanu Reeves and Sandra Bullock.  It  was released on June 16, 2006 and was co-produced by Sonny Mallhi, Amit Walia, and Chris Krapek. To reference the original movie, "Il Mare" was used as the restaurant's name where Kate and Alex are supposed to meet.

References

External links 
 
 
 
 

2000 films
2000s romance films
South Korean romantic drama films
Romantic fantasy films
Films about time travel
Films set in 1997
Films set in 1999
Films set in Jeju
Films shot in Incheon
Films shot in Jeju
2000s Korean-language films
South Korean films remade in other languages
Magic realism films
2000s South Korean films